Legacy Highway is a combination of built, under construction, and planned freeways in northern Utah, United States, that will run along the west sides Utah, Salt Lake, Davis, and Weber counties and connect northeastern Juab County with western Weber County with the purpose of providing an alternate north–south transportation corridor to Interstate 15. Individually, Legacy Highway may refer to any or all of the following components:

 Legacy Parkway, a freeway in Davis County, Utah, United States (State Route 67)
 Mountain View Corridor, a freeway (under construction) Utah and Salt Lake counties in northern Utah, United States (State Route 85)